The fourteenth season of the American fictional drama television series ER first aired on September 27, 2007, and concluded on May 15, 2008. It consists of 19 episodes.

Plot

The series celebrates its 300th episode but due to the writers' strike this season runs three episodes shorter than normal. As a result, certain storylines were altered, including Gates' relationship with hospital chaplain Julia Dupree. With Kovač in Croatia, the focus shifts to Abby as she adapts to life as a single parent. Meanwhile, new ER chief Kevin Morretti continues to make his presence felt until he makes a swift exit, Pratt is angered when locum Dr. Wexler is appointed as Morretti's replacement, Sam and Gates start a relationship and Jeanie Boulet makes a return to the ER when her son is brought in.

Cast

Main cast
 Goran Visnjic as Dr. Luka Kovač, Hospice Physician
 Maura Tierney as Dr. Abby Lockhart, Fourth Year Resident
 Mekhi Phifer as Dr. Greg Pratt, Attending Physician
 Parminder Nagra as Dr. Neela Rasgotra, Second Year Surgical Resident
 John Stamos as Dr. Tony Gates, Second Year Resident
 Linda Cardellini as Nurse Samantha Taggart
 Scott Grimes as Dr. Archie Morris, Attending Physician

Supporting

Doctors and medical students
 Stanley Tucci as Dr. Kevin Moretti, Chief of Emergency Medicine
 Leland Orser as Dr. Lucien Dubenko, Chief of Surgery
 Kari Matchett as Dr. Skye Wexler, Acting Chief of Emergency Medicine
 David Lyons as Dr. Simon Brenner, ER Attending Physician
 Sam Anderson as Dr. Jack Kayson, Chief of Cardiology
 Amy Aquino as Dr. Janet Coburn, Chief of Obstetrics
 John Aylward as Dr. Donald Anspaugh, Chief of Staff
 J. P. Manoux as Dr. Dustin Crenshaw, Surgical Attending Physician
 Gina Ravera as Dr. Betina DeJesus, Radiologist
 Busy Philipps as Dr. Hope Bobeck, Intern
 Malaya Rivera Drew as Katey Alvaro, Medical Student
 Charles Esten as Dr. Grossman, Orthopedics
 Robert Gossett as Dr. Everett Daniels, Hospital Board Member
 Anthony Starke as Dr. Craig, Orthopedics
 Michael Buchman Silver as Dr. Paul Meyers, Psychiatrist
 Steven Christopher Parker as Dr. Harold Zalinsky, Surgical Intern
 Gil McKinney as Dr. Paul Grady, ER Intern
 Bresha Webb as Laverne St. John, Medical Student
 Julia Jones as Kaya Montoya, Medical Student
Marc Jablon as Dr. Larry Weston, Second Year Resident
 Patrick Cassidy as Dr. Ramsey

Nurses
 Deezer D as Nurse Malik McGrath
 Laura Cerón as Nurse Chuny Marquez
 Yvette Freeman as Nurse Haleh Adams
 Lily Mariye as Nurse Lily Jarvik
 Dinah Lenney as Nurse Shirley
Angel Laketa Moore as Nurse Dawn Archer
 Bellina Logan as Nurse Kit
Nadia Shazana as Nurse Jacy
 Nasim Pedrad as Nurse Suri
 Mónica Guzmán as Nurse Marisol

Staff, Paramedics and Officers
Troy Evans as Desk Clerk Frank Martin
 Jesse Borrego as Desk Clerk Javier
 Reiko Aylesworth as Julia Dupree, Hospital Chaplain
 Emily Wagner as Paramedic Doris Pickman
 Montae Russell as Paramedic Dwight Zadro
 Lyn Alicia Henderson as Paramedic Pamela Olbes
 Brian Lester as Paramedic Brian Dumar
 Michelle C. Bonilla as Paramedic Christine Harms
 Demetrius Navarro as Paramedic Morales
 Louie Liberti	as Paramedic Bardelli
 Brendan Patrick Connor as Paramedic Reidy
 Meg Thalken as Chopper EMT Dee McManus
 Christopher Amitrano as Officer Hollis
 Demetrius Grosse as Officer Newkirk
 Joe Manganiello as Officer Litchman

Family
 Chloe Greenfield as Sarah Riley
 Bill Bolender as Hank Riley
 Frances Conroy as Becky Riley
 Sam Jones III as Chaz Pratt, EMT
 Rebecca Hazlewood as Jaspreet
 Michael Rady as Brian Moretti
 Andrew Gonzales and Aidan Gonzales as Joe Kovač
 Zoran Radanovich as Niko Kovač

Guest stars
 Gloria Reuben as Jeanie Boulet, Physician Assistant
 Cress Williams as Officer Reggie Moore
 Mae Whitman as Heather
 Peter Fonda as Pierce Tanner
 Jonathan Banks as Dr Robert Truman
 Hal Holbrook as Walter Perkins
 Josh Stewart as Daniel
 Mariana Klaveno as Rebecca
 Steve Buscemi as Art Masterson

Production
The season was executive produced by Christopher Chulack, Michael Crichton, John Wells, David Zabel, Joe Sachs, and Janine Sherman Barrois. Virgil Williams and Lisa Zwerling act as supervising producers. Wendy Spence Rosato serves as a producer. Tommy Burns is the season's unit production manager and the on-set producer of episodes. Dieter Ismagil and David Malloy served as associate producers on the first nine episodes of the season. Zabel, Sachs, Barrois, Williams, and Zwerling all worked as writers as well as producers. Karen Maser and Shannon Gross complete the writing staff.

Wells directed a single episode of the season and did not write any episodes for the first time. Chulack served as a regular director along with his production role and contributed four episodes including the series finale. Regular director Stephen Cragg also directed four episodes of the season including the series premiere. Returning director Andrew Bernstein contributed two episodes. New director Anthony Hemingway directed two episodes. Film director Rob Hardy directed a single episode, marking his debut in television. Long serving series directors Richard Thorpe and Félix Enríquez Alcalá each contribute a single episode this season. Former cast members Laura Innes and Paul McCrane continue to direct for the series, each contributing a single episode this season. Returning director Tawnia McKiernan also contributed a further episode this season.

Episodes

DVD 
The DVD of the series includes a half-hour featurette recorded at the celebration event for the 300th episode.

References

External links 

2007 American television seasons
2008 American television seasons
ER (TV series) seasons